As a surname, Pia may refer to:

 Frank Pia, lifeguard who invented the Pia carry
 Pascal Pia (1903-1979), French writer, journalist, illustrator and scholar born Pierre Durand
 Secondo Pia (1855–1941), Italian lawyer and amateur photographer best known for taking the first photographs of the Shroud of Turin
 Ulla Pia (born 1945), Danish singer